Amaury García may refer to:

 Amaury García (baseball) (born 1975), Dominican baseball player
 Amaury García (footballer) (born 2001), Mexican footballer